The 1960 Belgian Grand Prix was a Formula One motor race held at Spa-Francorchamps on 19 June 1960. It was race 5 of 10 in the 1960 World Championship of Drivers and race 4 of 9 in the 1960 International Cup for Formula One Manufacturers. Stirling Moss and Mike Taylor were seriously injured in crashes during practice, and Chris Bristow and Alan Stacey were killed in accidents during the race. With the 1994 San Marino Grand Prix, it is one of two occasions in which two driver fatalities have occurred at a Formula One race meeting, and the only one where both occurred during the race itself.

Practice and race laps 1-19 
Practice for the event saw Stirling Moss and Mike Taylor injured in separate accidents, with Taylor suffering injuries after a crash at Stavelot which ended his racing career, and Moss injured seriously enough (two broken legs) after crashing at Burnenville to keep him out of racing for a number of months including the 1960 24 Hours of Le Mans.  In the race itself, the Lotus drivers Innes Ireland and Jim Clark got off to good starts before Ireland eventually spun out with clutch trouble on lap 14.

Fatal accidents 
On lap 20 Chris Bristow, driving a year-old Cooper for the British Racing Partnership, went off line at Malmedy while battling for sixth place with the Ferrari of Mairesse. Bristow lost control, crashing into a four-foot high embankment and was thrown from his car, and landed on a barbed wire which beheaded him.

Five laps later, Alan Stacey was hit in the face by a bird at Masta, causing his car to crash, then somersault off the track and land in a field. The car then caught fire, and Stacey, still trapped inside, was burned to death. It was the only Formula One race meeting in which two drivers were killed until the deaths of Roland Ratzenberger and Ayrton Senna at the 1994 San Marino Grand Prix.

Race conclusion 
The race distance had been lengthened to 36 laps from 24 laps. The results highlight an unusual quirk in the rules regarding classification of non-finishers. Under modern rules, Graham Hill would have been classified third, since he completed lap 35 before the lapped Olivier Gendebien. Hill then retired, in the pits, but was not classified since he did not push his car over the line after the winner took the finish (as required by the rules of the time). In fact the rule about crossing the finishing line was inconsistently applied – at the 1959 German Grand Prix, Harry Schell was classified seventh despite only completing 49 of the race's 60 laps.

Classification

Qualifying

Race

Championship standings after the race

Drivers' Championship standings

Constructors' Championship standings

 Notes: Only the top five positions are included for both sets of standings.

References 

Belgian Grand Prix
Belgian Grand Prix
Grand Prix